Mutiny on the Blackhawk is a 1939 American adventure film, directed by Christy Cabanne. It stars Richard Arlen, Andy Devine, and Constance Moore, and was released on September 1, 1939.

Cast list
Richard Arlen as Captain Robert Lawrence
Andy Devine as Slim Collins
Constance Moore as Helen [Bailey]
Noah Beery as Captain
Guinn "Big Boy" Williams as Mate
Ray Mala as Woni
Thurston Hall as Sam Bailey
Sandra Kane as Tania [Bailey]
Paul Fix as Jack
Richard Lane as Kit Carson

References

External links

Universal Pictures films
1939 adventure films
American adventure films
Films directed by Christy Cabanne
American black-and-white films
1930s American films
1930s English-language films